Tonie Marshall (29 November 1951 – 12 March 2020) was a French-American actress, screenwriter, and film director. In 2000, she became the first female director to win a César award for her film Venus Beauty Institute.

Life and career
Marshall was the daughter of American actor, director, and bandleader William Marshall and French actress Micheline Presle. She was also the aunt of model and actress Sarah Marshall, and the half-sister of actor Mike Marshall, son of the actress Michèle Morgan.

Before becoming a director, Tonie Marshall was an actress, first in drama and then in television and film, where she played several little parts in the 1970s and 1980s. As she recalls on his beginning on-screen: "I was an actress because it was what seemed the more natural for me, but I was interested a lot in writing and production. I was quite afraid not to make it [directing films]. Because I was a little actress, that I did not attend a specialized school, that I did not have any technique". During her childhood, she also developed her experience of films thanks to the arthouse cinema of the Ursulines in the 5th arrondissement of Paris, near which she grew up.

After performing minor parts in several of Jacques Demy's films, including A Slightly Pregnant Man (1973) and La Naissance du Jour (1980), Marshall directed her first film, Pentimento (1990), offering the radio and television host Antoine de Caunes his first role in cinema.

In 1994, her film Pas très Catholique was selected as part of the 44th Berlin International Film Festival.

Tonie Marshall's 1999 film Venus Beauty Institute (Vénus beauté (Institut)) won four César Awards during the 2000 competition including Best Director, making her the first female filmmaker to receive this distinction. The César Academy also awarded Venus Beauty Institute with Best Film, Best Writing - Original or Adaptation, as well as Most Promising Actress for Audrey Tautou, whose career was launched by the film.

This romantic comedy centers on the search for love and happiness of three employees of a Parisian beauty salon "Vénus Beauté Institut":  Angèle (Nathalie Baye), Marie (Audrey Tautou), Samantha (Mathilde Seigner), and their manager Nadine (Bulle Ogier). Tonie Marshall's mother Micheline Presle also appears in the film where she plays the part of Aunt Maryse. In a 2001 interview for the film magazine Cinéaste, Tonie Marshall recalls the genesis of the film and how she was inspired by an existing beauty salon:

"My first idea was to write a part for Nathalie Baye because I wanted to do something with her that she had not done before: a woman with a very nice appearance, very banal, but who is, in fact, very mixed up and complicated. But I hadn't decided what she would do for a living in the film. Then one day I was passing by a small beauty salon on my street - the light was pink and there was a girl, a beautician I suppose, dressed in pink; and she was closing the shop very, very slowly. Her movement, absolutely like she was dancing, but very slowly, struck me as being an entirely cinematic image. I went back to this beauty parlor as a customer, and when I was there I heard so many incredible things."

Tonie Marshall has been mostly influenced by Jacques Demy's films throughout her career, the most famous ones being The Umbrellas of Cherbourg (1964) and The Young Girls of Rochefort (1967). Venus Beauty emerged from this influence, as well as an additional source of inspiration: the French film Belle de Jour (1964) directed by Luis Bunuel and starring Catherine Deneuve.

In 2002 her film Au plus près du Paradis was nominated for the Golden Lion Award as best film at the Venice Film Festival.

Marshall was a signatory of the "Free Roman Polanski" petition following film director Roman Polanski's arrest in Switzerland in 2009, which read: "We demand the immediate release of Roman Polanski. Film-makers in France, in Europe, in the United States and around the world are dismayed by this decision… It seems inadmissible to them that an international cultural event, paying homage to one of the greatest contemporary film-makers, is used by police to apprehend him.” 

In 2017, Marshall released Number One (also released as Woman Up! in the UK and the US), her last feature film, which is based on her conversation with various female corporate executives. The film relates the story of Emmanuelle Blachey (Emmanuelle Devos), an engineer who tries to reach the manager position in a company with the help of her female counterparts and despite the misogynistic atmosphere that rules over the firm.

On March 12, 2020, she died from lung cancer at the age of 68.

Activism 
Although Tonie Marshall would not label herself as a feminist, many of her films involve an underlying fight against sexism, especially the later ones including Number One in which she overtly advocates gender equality in the professional sphere.

Off-set, she was one of the members of the French 50/50 Collective, founded in 2018 and which promotes gender diversity and equality in the film industry. The same year, she also joined the Fondation des femmes, founded in March 2016, which aims to raise funds for feminist organizations. During the 2018 César Awards Ceremony and in association with the foundation, Tonie Marshall participated in the #MaintenantOnAgit movement as part of which she called diverse personalities to wear a white ribbon as a symbol of the struggle against violence against women.

In an interview given to the French newspaper La Tribune in 2017 for the release of Number One, Marshall addressed her young female spectators, saying: "For the world to evolve, and to reach true modernity, 45-50% of women should get to decision-making professional positions in order to finally experience a different organization in work and business. If I could help with it, I would be very glad. And if people who watched my film get out of the theater telling themselves "this made me want the same", it is an absolute joy."

In 2001, Marshall was asked a question about the role played by women filmmakers in France, to which she answered: "Toscan du Plantier, the president of Unifrance, says that French cinema will be saved by women. This may be just a formule, pretty words, I don't know. But I do think that maybe the way we shoot a scene of two people making love is pretty different."

Work

Filmography (Films and TV)

Drama

Recognition 
Marshall achieved a prominent role in the French film industry, dominated mainly by men. In her most notable film, Venus Beauty Institute, Marshall touched on the theme of finding love from a female perspective, and how it can fundamentally be more difficult because of how it strays from the traditional dynamic of courtship. She explained how "in a practical sense, it’s complicated to have abandon [oneself] into a man’s arms and, at the same time, stay very tough because you have to work…". This expresses the vulnerabilities women endure when heavily committing to relationships, similar to much of Demy's work, including The Umbrellas of Cherbourg and The Young Girls of Rochefort.

Honors 
For her 1999 film Venus Beauty Institute :

 2000 Cesar for Best Film
 2000 Cesar for Best Director
 2000 Cesar for Best Writing - Original or Adaptation
 2000 Cesar for Most Promising Actress - Audrey Tautou

Nominations 
For her 1999 film Venus Beauty Institute :

 2000 Cesar for Best Actress - Nathalie Baye
 2000 Cesar for Best Supporting Actress - Bulle Ogier
 2000 Cesar for Best Supporting Actress - Mathilde Seigner

References

Additional sources

Books 
Hottel, Ruth A. & Pallister, Janis L. (2011). Noteworthy Francophone Women Directors: A Sequel, Fairleigh Dickinson University Press.

Hughes, Alex & Williams James S. (2001). Gender and French Cinema, Berg.

Oscherwitz, Dayna & Higgins, Mary Ellen (2007). Historical Dictionary of French Cinema, The Scarecrow Press.

Rège, Philippe (2009). Encyclopedia of French Film Directors, The Scarecrow Press.

Rollet, Brigitte & Tarr, Carrie (2001). Cinema and the second sex: women's filmmaking in France in the 1980s and 1990s, Continuum.

Articles 
Champalaune, Mathieu (updated 16 March 2021). "300 personnalités du cinéma lancent le collectif "5050 pour 2020" pour l'égalité dans le cinéma", Les Inrockuptibles.

(https://www.lesinrocks.com/cinema/300-personnalites-du-cinema-lancent-le-collectif-5050-pour-2020-pour-legalite-dans-le-cinema-136666-28-02-2018/)

Nougué, Emilie (visited 24 September 2022). "Les femmes de la semaine du 24 février au 2 mars 2018", Orange Tendances.

(https://tendances.orange.fr/societe/femmes-de-la-semaine/diaporama-les-femmes-de-la-semaine-du-24-fevrier-au-2-mars-2018-CNT000000ZcJv5/tonie-marshall-lutte-contre-les-violences-faites-aux-femmes-076ed44d070fe088b17e4440d2786cfc.html#plmAnchor)

West Joan M. (2001) "Venus Beauty Institute by Gilles Sandoz, Tonie Marshall, Mario Vernoux, Jacques Audiard", Cinéaste, Vol 26, No. 2, pp. 44-46.

(https://www.jstor.org/stable/41689344)

[Author unknown] (27 February 2018). "César 2018. Un ruban blanc pour lutter contre les violences faites aux femmes", Ouest France.

(https://www.ouest-france.fr/cinema/les-cesar/cesar-2018-un-ruban-blanc-pour-lutter-contre-les-violences-faites-aux-femmes-5591415)

[Author unknown] (22 August 2022). "Micheline Presle, l'audacieuse", CNC.

(https://www.cnc.fr/cinema/actualites/micheline-presle-laudacieuse_1752617)

Documentaries and Interviews 
"1972: Tonie Marshall, une jeune actrice | Archive INA", Institut National de l'Audiovisuel.

(Youtube: https://www.youtube.com/watch?v=e_v3IvmdW-A)

"Qui était Tonie Marshall? | Archive INA", Institut National de l'Audiovisuel.

(Youtube: https://www.youtube.com/watch?v=Pr_2mfUZfKA)

"Tonie Marshall, réalisatrice de Numéro Une: "il faut des réseaux mixtes, pas uniquement féminins", Cadremploi.

(Youtube: https://www.youtube.com/watch?v=Tp7QJDls2uw)

External links 

 
 Tonie Marshall at Allocine (French language)

1951 births
2020 deaths
People from Neuilly-sur-Seine
French women film directors
French film actresses
French film directors
French people of American descent
Place of death missing
Best Director César Award winners
French women screenwriters
French screenwriters
French film producers
French women film producers